Wandering Fires is a 1925 American silent drama film produced and directed by Maurice Campbell and stars Constance Bennett. It was distributed in the United States by Arrow Film Corporation and in the United Kingdom by Film Booking Offices of America. Campbell's wife, stage star Henrietta Crosman, appears in the film.

Plot
As described in a film magazine review, a young woman who is the victim of a scandalous tale involving her lover, who is believed killed in France during the World War, is loved by another young man who, knowing the tale, still urges her to marry him. After they are married, the husband becomes jealous of the lost lover, who one day turns up with an arm gone and his mind a blank from shell shock. His mental balance is restored, however, and he absolves his former sweetheart of any wrongdoing. Thereafter, the husband and wife are happy again.

Cast
Constance Bennett as Guerda Anthony
George Hackathorne as Raymond Carroll
Wallace MacDonald as Norman Yuell
Effie Shannon as Mrs. Satorius
Henrietta Crosman as Mrs. Carroll

Preservation
A print of Wandering Fires is held by the George Eastman House.

References

External links
 

1925 films
American silent feature films
Film Booking Offices of America films
American black-and-white films
Films directed by Maurice Campbell
1925 drama films
Silent American drama films
Arrow Film Corporation films
1920s American films